Harald Rudyard Engman (1903-1968) was a Danish artist, painter. Above all, he is remembered for his fierce use of satire in criticizing and resisting the German occupation of Denmark during World War II.

Biography
Little has been published about Engman's life. It is known that he traveled as a working seaman and spent some time living in New York City's Chinatown around 1920. He began to show paintings in Copenhagen in the mid 1920s. He became part of a group of self-styled "Underground Painters". His shows always inspired controversy as he utilized caricature and satire to mercilessly criticize social ills and those in power especially the growing power of the Nazi Party in Germany. These shows culminated in 1940 with the "Black Banners" show in Copenhagen aimed directly at the Nazi leadership. Refusing to remain silent about Hitler, Engman "depicted Der Fuhrer, not as a genius of satanic majesty, as many Danish Anti-Nazis saw him, but as a psychopathic misfit, a frightened and conceited fool, sort of a ludicrous master clown of the world's arena." Following this show Engman was forced into exile in the North Zealand and eventually fled occupied Denmark for Sweden where he remained through the war. From Sweden he continued to fight the Nazis with his art painting and contributing drawings to the journal "The Dane" as well as some Swedish publications.

Artistic style and works
Engman's artistic style was fiercely independent and self-taught. He did not move in the modern directions of surreal or abstract art, nor was he following the traditional Danish folk painters. His style combines a keen sense of caricature occasionally verging on the comic with a real mastery of the use of light and color to evoke emotion.

References

Literature

External links
Examples of Engman's paintings
High-Resolution zoomable annotated version of the Human Pyramid painting

1903 births
1968 deaths
20th-century Danish painters
Danish satirists
Danish cartoonists
Danish caricaturists